Iceland participated in the Eurovision Song Contest 1991 in Rome. Stefán and Eyfi represented Iceland with the song "Nína". They finished in 15th place out of 22 countries with 26 points.

Before Eurovision

Söngvakeppni Sjónvarpsins 1991 
The Icelandic broadcaster, Ríkisútvarpið (RÚV), held a national final to select the Icelandic entry for the Eurovision Song Contest 1991 - Söngvakeppni Sjónvarpsins 1991. The contest was held at the RÚV TV studios in Reykjavík on 9 February 1991, hosted by Valgeir Guðjónsson. 10 songs competed, with the winner being decided through the votes of 8 regional juries and an expert jury. The winner was Stefán Hilmarsson and Eyjólfur Kristjánsson with the song "Draumur um Nínu", composed by Kristjánsson.

At Eurovision

Voting

References

1991
Countries in the Eurovision Song Contest 1991
Eurovision